Chrysocraspeda faganaria is a moth of the family Geometridae first described by Achille Guenée in 1858. It is found in Japan, Java, Sumatra, Singapore, Borneo, Taiwan, and Sri Lanka.

References

Moths of Asia
Moths described in 1858